The Italian composer Gaetano Donizetti (1797–1848) is best known for his operas, of which he wrote about 75 from 1816 to 1845.

List of operas

Notes

References

Sources

Allitt, John Stewart (1991), Donizetti: in the light of Romanticism and the teaching of Johann Simon Mayr, Shaftesbury: Element Books, Ltd (UK); Rockport, MA: Element, Inc.(USA)
 Ashbrook, William (1982). Donizetti and His Operas. Cambridge University Press., .
 Ashbrook, William (1992). "Donizetti, (Domenico) Gaetano (Maria): work-list" in Sadie 1992, vol. 1, pp. 1215–1218.
 Ashbrook, William; Hibberd, Sarah (2001). "Gaetano Donizetti", pp. 224–247 in The New Penguin Opera Guide, edited by Amanda Holden. New York: Penguin Putnam. .
 Osborne, Charles (1994). The Bel Canto Operas of Rossini, Donizetti, and Bellini. Portland, Oregon: Amadeus Press. .
 Sadie, Stanley, editor (1992). The New Grove Dictionary of Opera (4 volumes). London: Macmillan. .
 Sadie, Stanley, editor; John Tyrell; executive editor (2001). The New Grove Dictionary of Music and Musicians, 2nd edition. London: Macmillan.  (hardcover).  (eBook).
 Smart, Mary Ann; Budden, Julian (2001). "Donizetti, (Domenico) Gaetano (Maria)" in Sadie 2001.
 Steiner-Isenmann, Robert (1982). Gaetano Donizetti: sein Leben und seine Opern. Berne: Hallwag. .
 Weinstock, Herbert (1963). Donizetti and the World of Opera in Italy, Paris, and Vienna in the First Half of the Nineteenth Century. New York: Pantheon Books. .

External links
List of Donizetti operas at opera.stanford.edu

Lists of operas by composer
 
Lists of compositions by composer

nl:Gaetano Donizetti#Opera's